Kamel Alouini (born 6 July 1988) is a Tunisian handball player for Dunkerque HGL and the Tunisian national team.

Achievements  
Tunisian League:
Winner: 2013, 2014, 2016, 2017 
Tunisian Cup:
Winner: 2011, 2013  
Romanian League:
Winner: 2019 
Romanian Supercup:
Winner: 2018, 2019 
French League Cup:
Winner: 2009 
African Championship:
Gold Medalist: 2012, 2018
Pan Arab Games: 
Bronze Medalist: 2011

Individual awards
 Supercupa României MVP: 2018

References

External links

1988 births
Living people
People from La Marsa
Tunisian male handball players
Olympic handball players of Tunisia
Handball players at the 2012 Summer Olympics 
Expatriate handball players
Tunisian expatriate sportspeople in France
Tunisian expatriate sportspeople in Romania
Tunisian expatriate sportspeople in Saudi Arabia
Competitors at the 2013 Mediterranean Games
Competitors at the 2018 Mediterranean Games
Mediterranean Games silver medalists for Tunisia
Mediterranean Games medalists in handball